Ronnie Milsap Live is the first live album by country music artist Ronnie Milsap. It was recorded at the Grand Ole Opry House in Nashville, Tennessee, in 1976, the same year Milsap became a member of the Grand Ole Opry, and released that same year. Country music disc jockey and television host Ralph Emery introduced Milsap at the concert and also wrote the album's liner notes.

The album spent 24 weeks on the Billboard Top Country Albums chart, peaking at No. 2.

Ronnie Milsap Live won the Country Music Association Award for Album of the Year in 1977, Milsap's second win in that category. In 1979, it was certified Gold by the Recording Industry Association of America for US shipments exceeding 500,000.

Track listing

Introduction — Ralph Emery
Pure Love (3:27)
Medley: I Hate You/That Girl Who Waits on Tables (3:28)
Welcome — Talk by Ronnie Milsap
Medley: (I'm A) Stand By My Woman Man/What Goes On When the Sun Goes Down/Daydreams About Night Things (3:28)
Busy Makin' Plans (2:50)
Kaw-Liga (5:42)
Country Cookin' (5:40)
I Can Almost See Houston From Here (3:21)
(After Sweet Memories) Play Born to Lose Again (2:56)
Music Style Medley: Daydreams About Night Things/Cattle Call (2:54)
Let My Love Be Your Pillow (2:57)
(I'd Be) A Legend in My Time (2:53)
Honky Tonk Women (4:15)

Personnel
Ronnie Milsap — vocals, piano
Shane Keister — ARP
Charlie McCoy — harmonica, vibes
Stephen Holt — drums
Jimmy Capps — rhythm guitar
Johnny Cobb – bass
Dicky Overbey — steel guitar
Jerry McCoy, Jack Watkins — guitar
Jim Buchanan, Tommy Williams — fiddle
The Nashville Edition — vocal accompaniment

Charts

Weekly charts

Year-end charts

References

1976 albums
Ronnie Milsap albums
RCA Records albums
Albums produced by Tom Collins (record producer)